100. Yıl Albümü (a.k.a. BJK 100. Yıl Marşları) (English: Centennial Album) is a stadium anthems and football chants based album, recorded following the Turkish League triumph of Beşiktaş in 2003, their 100th year of foundation, prepared by Turkish musicians Mustafa Sandal and Ufuk Yıldırım, and composers Reha Falay and Murat Zor.

Background and reception
Released in late May 2003, the album was initially promoted in Laila, a now-defunct dance music venue/nightclub, in front of around 2,000 attendees, along with club officials and footballers. The album consists of arrangements of fan chants and well-known local songs such as "Samanyolu", "İnleyen Nağmeler", and "Çilli Bom", as well as former world hit covers such as "Eye Of The Tiger" and "We Will Rock You".

The album has sold over 125,000 copies.

Track list
Source: Idefix, TurkPop.com

References

External links
 Playlist at YouTube

2003 albums
Turkish-language albums
Football songs and chants
Mustafa Sandal albums
Collaborative albums